The 1981 NCAA Division II Lacrosse Championship was the eighth annual single-elimination tournament to determine the national champions of NCAA Division II men's college lacrosse in the United States.

This would be the final edition of the Division II men's tournament until 1993.

The final, and only match of the tournament, was played at Motamed Field at Adelphi University in Garden City, New York. 

Hosts Adelphi defeated Loyola (MD), 17–14, to win their second national title. The Panthers (10–2) were coached by Paul Doherty. This was Adelphi's second title in three seasons.

Bracket

See also
1981 NCAA Division I Men's Lacrosse Championship
1981 NCAA Division III Lacrosse Championship

References

NCAA Division II Men's Lacrosse Championship
NCAA Division II Men's Lacrosse Championship
NCAA Division II Men's Lacrosse